The SQUAMOSA promoter binding protein-like (SBP or SPL) family of transcription factors are defined by a plant-specific DNA-binding domain. The founding member of the family was identified based on its specific in vitro binding to the promoter of the snapdragon SQUAMOSA gene. SBP proteins are thought to be transcriptional activators.

Function 

SPB proteins have roles in leaf development, vegetative phase change, flower and fruit development, plant architecture, sporogenesis, Gibberelic acid signaling and toxin response.

Structure 

The domain contains 10 conserved cysteine and histidine residues that probably are zinc ligands.
The SBP domain is a highly conserved DNA-binding domain. It is approximately 80 amino acids in length and contains a zinc finger motif
with two zinc-binding sites: Cys-Cys-His-Cys and Cys-Cys-Cys-His. It has a three-stranded antiparallel beta-sheet.

References

External links 
SBP family at PlantTFDB: Plant Transcription Factor Database

Protein domains
Transcription factors